The Perfect Cult is the fourth studio album by the Swedish metal band Deathstars. It was released on 13 June 2014 via Nuclear Blast.

Track listing

Background 
In an interview with New Noise magazine, frontman Whiplasher Bernadotte was asked what the band did differently in this album. Bernadotte responded saying that "It's different in a lot of ways, for example it's also not as outgoing as the previous ones. It's more personal this time. Private. It's not party darkness, more personal darkness. Also it's more synth oriented sound wise and has a slower pace throughout the material." and describing the music as "European audiosex". When asked about recording Bernadotte explains how some songs were "written just a few months before we entered the studio", whereas others have "been ready for several years".

Reception 
The album was met with generally positive reviews, with Cryptic Rock rating it 5/5, saying that the album "gifts quality instead of quantity, making it perhaps their best album to date and one of the biggest surprises in 2014". PlanetMosh also gave the album a full 5/5, saying that the "tracks dynamically waves from fast rock'n'roll like, to sing along anthem and marches again until the end. There is no way, it is possible to get bored through all of this". Metal-Temple gave it an 8/10 (excellent), saying that the album "does not represent anything completely new or innovative" and that the album is "an auditory representation of the yin yang symbol: the first half is lighter and frankly slightly lacklustre, with a hint of underlying darkness". sputnikmusic gave the album a 3/5 (good), saying that "Deathstars work on their musical formula and produce a sound which is definitely bigger, but not necessarily better, than before".

Charts

Personnel 
 Whiplasher Bernadotte – vocals
 Nightmare Industries – guitars, keyboards
 Skinny Disco – bass
 Vice – drums

Production
Produced by Nightmare Industries and Roberto Laghi.
Recorded by Nightmare Industries, Roberto Laghi, Skinny Disco, Bohus Sounds Recording, Gig Studios & Black Syndicate
Mixed by Stefan Glaumann.
Mastered by Svante Forsbäck at Chartmakers, Helsinki, Finland
Artwork and graphic design by Fabio Timpanaro

References 

2014 albums
Deathstars albums